Jenny Tomasin (22 March 1938 – 3 January 2012) was an English actress best known for her roles in Upstairs, Downstairs and Emmerdale.

Early life
Tomasin was born in Leeds, West Riding of Yorkshire, in 1938 to working class parents. She knew from an early age she wanted to be an actress, although her parents did not support her goal.

Career
Tomasin's first screen role was in 1972 in The Adventures of Barry McKenzie, as the character Sarah Gort. Her first major role came when she was discovered by Upstairs, Downstairs producer John Hawkesworth, who noticed Tomasin's photograph in a casting directory. Soon after, Tomasin joined the cast of Upstairs, Downstairs as Ruby, the kitchen maid to the Bellamy family.

Tomasin appeared in the series from 1972, until it came to an end in 1975. She appeared in 41 episodes. Plans were made for a spin-off series featuring Ruby and fellow Upstairs, Downstairs characters Hudson and Mrs Bridges; however, the series was never made because of the death of actress Angela Baddeley. Although her career on Upstairs, Downstairs had made Tomasin a household name, she also felt that the role left her typecast.

In 1985, Tomasin guest starred in the Doctor Who serial Revelation of the Daleks, the final story before the series went on an 18-month hiatus, as the character Tasambeker. Tomasin also played two roles in the soap opera Emmerdale. In 1981–1982 she played Naomi Tolly, daughter of Enoch Tolly, who was killed in a tractor accident. Her second role was as Noreen Bell, a cantankerous villager who died in July 2006. This would be her last role.

Her other films included roles in Mister Quilp (1975), The Trouble with Spies (1987) and Just Ask for Diamond (1988).

Death
Tomasin died on 3 January 2012 from hypertensive heart disease.

References

External links

Jenny Tomasin; Aveleyman

1930s births
2012 deaths
English film actresses
English soap opera actresses
English television actresses
Actresses from Leeds
Year of birth uncertain